Julian Jakobs (born 15 February 1990) is a German footballer who plays for Sportfreunde Siegen.

External links

 Julian Jakobs at Fupa

1990 births
Sportspeople from Siegen
Footballers from North Rhine-Westphalia
Living people
German footballers
Association football midfielders
Sportfreunde Siegen players
FC Hansa Rostock players
TSV Steinbach Haiger players
3. Liga players
Regionalliga players
Oberliga (football) players